Harry Bertram may refer to:

A character in the novel Guy Mannering, by Sir Walter Scott
Harry Bertram, the American Third Position Party's candidate in the West Virginia gubernatorial special election, 2011

See also
Henry Bertram (disambiguation)